Wu Chunyan (born 6 December 1989) is a Chinese Paralympic archer. She represented China at the 2016 Summer Paralympics held in Rio de Janeiro, Brazil and she won two medals: the gold medal in the mixed team recurve open event and the silver medal in the women's individual recurve open event.

She won the bronze medal in the women's individual recurve open event at the 2020 Summer Paralympics in Tokyo, Japan. She also won the bronze medal in the mixed team recurve open event.

References

External links 
 

Living people
1989 births
Chinese female archers
Archers at the 2016 Summer Paralympics
Archers at the 2020 Summer Paralympics
Medalists at the 2016 Summer Paralympics
Medalists at the 2020 Summer Paralympics
Paralympic gold medalists for China
Paralympic silver medalists for China
Paralympic bronze medalists for China
Paralympic medalists in archery
Paralympic archers of China
Sportspeople from Xi'an
21st-century Chinese women